The griffin, griffon, or gryphon (Ancient Greek: , gryps; Classical Latin: grȳps or grȳpus; Late and Medieval Latin: gryphes, grypho etc.; Old French: griffon) is a legendary creature with the body, tail, and back legs of a lion; the head and wings of an eagle; and sometimes an eagle's talons as its front feet. Because the lion was traditionally considered the king of the beasts, and the eagle the king of the birds, by the Middle Ages, the griffin was thought to be an especially powerful and majestic creature. Since classical antiquity, griffins were known for guarding treasures and priceless possessions.

In Greek and Roman texts, griffins and Arimaspians were associated with gold deposits of Central Asia. Indeed, as Pliny the Elder wrote, "griffins were said to lay eggs in burrows on the ground and these nests contained gold nuggets."

In medieval heraldry, the griffin became a Christian symbol of divine power and a guardian of the divine.

Etymology

The derivation of this word remains uncertain. It could be related to the Greek word  (grypos), meaning 'curved', or 'hooked'. It could also have been an Anatolian loan word derived from a Semitic language; compare the Hebrew word for cherub  (kerúv).

Form
Most statuary representations of griffins depict them with bird-like forelegs and talons, although in some older illustrations griffins have a lion's forelegs (see below); they generally have a lion's hindquarters. Its eagle's head is conventionally given prominent ears; these are sometimes described as the lion's ears, but are often elongated (more like a horse's), and are sometimes feathered.

Infrequently, a griffin is portrayed without wings, or a wingless eagle-headed lion is identified as a griffin. In 15th-century and later heraldry, such a beast may be called an alke, a keythong or a male griffin.

The opinicus or epimacu is another heraldic variety of griffin, with the body and four legs of a lion, the head, neck and wings of an eagle, and a camel's short tail. It is sometimes wingless.

History

Representations of griffin-like hybrids with four legs and a beaked head appeared in Ancient Egyptian art dating back to before 3000 BC. In Egypt, a griffin-like animal can be seen in a cosmetic palette from Hierakonpolis, known as the "Two Dog Palette", which is dated to  BC.

In Iranian mythology, the griffin is called Shirdal, which means "Lion-Eagle". The Shirdal has appeared in ancient art of Iran since the late 2nd millennium BC. Shirdals appeared on cylinder seals from Susa as early as 3000 BC. Shirdals also are common motifs in the art of Luristan, the North and North West region of Iran in the Iron Age, and Achaemenian art.

Griffin-type creatures combining raptor heads and mammalian bodies were depicted in the Levant, Syria, and Anatolia in the Middle Bronze Age, dated at about 1950–1550 BC. Early depictions of griffin-types in Minoan art are found in the 15th century BC frescoes in the Throne Room of the Bronze Age Palace of Knossos, as restored by Sir Arthur Evans. Bird-mammal composites were a decorative theme in Archaic and Classical Greek art, but became quite popular in the 6th and 5th centuries BC, when the Greeks first began to record accounts of the "gryps" creature from travelers to Asia, such as Aristeas of Proconnesus. In Central Asia, the griffin image was included in Scythian "animal style" artifacts of the 6th–4th centuries BC, but no writings explain their meaning.

Griffin images appeared in art of the Achaemenian Persian Empire. Russian jewelry historian Elena Neva maintained that the Achaemenids considered the griffin "a protector from evil, witchcraft, and secret slander", but no writings exist from Achaemenid Persia to support her claim. R.L. Fox (1973) remarks that a “lion-griffin” attacks a stag in a pebble mosaic at Pella, from the 4th century BC, perhaps serving as an emblem of the kingdom of Macedon or a personal emblem of Antipater, one of Alexander's successors.

The Pisa Griffin is a large bronze sculpture that has been in Pisa in Italy since the Middle Ages, though it is of Islamic origin. It is the largest bronze medieval Islamic sculpture known, at over 3 feet tall (42.5 inches, or 1.08 m), and was probably created in the 11th century AD in Al-Andaluz (Islamic Spain). From about 1100 it was placed on a column on the roof of Pisa Cathedral until replaced by a replica in 1832; the original is now in the Museo dell' Opera del Duomo (Cathedral Museum), Pisa.

Ancient parallels
Several ancient mythological creatures are similar to the griffin. These include the Lamassu, an Assyrian protective deity, often depicted with a bull or lion's body, eagle's wings, and human's head.

Sumerian and Akkadian mythology feature the demon Anzu, half man and half bird, associated with the chief sky god Enlil. This was a divine storm-bird linked with the southern wind and the thunder clouds.

Jewish mythology speaks of the Ziz, which resembles Anzu, as well as the ancient Greek Phoenix. The Bible mentions the Ziz in Psalms 50:11. This is also similar to a cherub. The cherub, or sphinx, was very popular in Phoenician iconography.

In ancient Crete, griffins became very popular, and were portrayed in various media. A similar creature is the Minoan Genius.

In the Hindu religion, Garuda is a large bird-like creature which serves as a
mount (vahana) of the Lord Vishnu. It is also the name for the constellation Aquila.

Medieval lore

In medieval legend, griffins not only mated for life, but if either partner died, then the other would continue the rest of its life alone, never to search for a new mate. The griffin was thus made an emblem of the Church's opposition to remarriage. Being a union of an aerial bird and a terrestrial beast, it was seen in Christendom to be a symbol of Jesus, who was both human and divine. As such it can be found sculpted on some churches.

According to Stephen Friar's New Dictionary of Heraldry, a griffin's claw was believed to have medicinal properties and one of its feathers could restore sight to the blind. Goblets fashioned from griffin claws (antelope horns) and griffin eggs (ostrich eggs) were highly prized in medieval European courts.

When Genoa emerged as a major seafaring power in the Middle Ages and the Renaissance, griffins commenced to be depicted as part of the republic's coat of arms, rearing at the sides of the shield bearing the Cross of St. George.

By the 12th century, the appearance of the griffin was substantially fixed: "All its bodily members are like a lion's, but its wings and mask are like an eagle's." It is not yet clear if its forelimbs are those of an eagle or of a lion. Although the description implies the latter, the accompanying illustration is ambiguous. It was left to the heralds to clarify that.

A hippogriff is a legendary creature, supposedly the offspring of a griffin and a mare.

In heraldry
In heraldry, the griffin's amalgamation of lion and eagle gains in courage and boldness, and it is always drawn to powerful fierce monsters. It is used to denote strength and military courage and leadership. Griffins are portrayed with the rear body of a lion, an eagle's head with erect ears, a feathered breast, and the forelegs of an eagle, including claws. These features indicate a combination of intelligence and strength.

Griffins may be shown in a variety of poses, but in British heraldry are never shown with their wings closed. Heraldic griffins use the same attitude terminology as the lion, with the exception that where a lion would be described as rampant a griffin is instead described as segreant.

In British heraldry, a male griffin is shown without wings, its body covered in tufts of formidable spikes, with a short tusk emerging from the forehead, as for a unicorn. This distinction is not found outside of British heraldry; even within it, male griffins are much rarer than winged ones, which are not given a specific name. It is possible that the male griffin originated as a derivation of the heraldic panther.

The sea-griffin, also termed the gryphon-marine, is a heraldic variant of the griffin possessing the head and legs of the more common variant and the hindquarters of a fish or a mermaid. Sea-griffins are present on the arms of a number of German noble families, including the Mestich family of Silesia and the Barony of Puttkamer.

The opincus is another heraldic variant, which is depicted with all four legs being those of a lion. Occasionally, its tail may be that of a camel or its wings may be absent. The opincus is rarely used in heraldry, but appears in the arms of the Worshipful Company of Barbers.

In architecture

In architectural decoration the griffin is usually represented as a four-footed beast with wings and the head of an eagle with horns, or with the head and beak of an eagle.

The statues that mark the entrance to the City of London are sometimes mistaken for griffins, but are in fact (Tudor) dragons, the supporters of the city's arms. They are most easily distinguished from griffins by their membranous, rather than feathered, wings.

In literature
 For fictional characters named Griffin, see Griffin (surname)
Flavius Philostratus mentioned them in The Life of Apollonius of Tyana:

Griffins are used widely in Persian poetry; Rumi is one such poet who writes in reference to griffins.

In Dante Alighieri's Divine Comedy, after Dante and Virgil's journey through Hell and Purgatory has concluded, Dante meets a chariot dragged by a griffin in Earthly Paradise. Immediately afterwards, Dante is reunited with Beatrice. Dante and Beatrice then start their journey through Paradise.

Sir John Mandeville wrote about them in his 14th century book of travels:

John Milton, in Paradise Lost II, refers to the legend of the griffin in describing Satan:

Griffins appear in the fairy tales "Jack the Giant Killer", "The Griffin" and "The Singing, Springing Lark".

In The Son of Neptune by Rick Riordan, Percy Jackson, Hazel Levesque, and Frank Zhang are attacked by griffins in Alaska.

In the Harry Potter series, the character Albus Dumbledore has a griffin-shaped knocker. Also, the character Godric Gryffindor's surname is a variation on the French griffon d'or ("golden griffon").

Pomponius Mela: "In Europe, constantly falling snow makes those places contiguous with the Riphean Mountains so impassable that, in addition, they prevent those who deliberately travel here from seeing anything. After that comes a region of very rich soil but quite uninhabitable because griffins, a savage and tenacious breed of wild beasts, love- to an amazing degree- the gold that is mined from deep within the earth there, and because they guard it with an amazing hostility to those who set foot there." (Romer, 1998.)

Isidore of Seville – "The Gryphes are so called because they are winged quadrupeds. This kind of wild beast is found in the Hyperborean Mountains. In every part of their body they are lions, and in wings and heads are like eagles, and they are fierce enemies of horses. Moreover they tear men to pieces." (Brehaut, 1912)

Modern uses
The griffin is the symbol of the Philadelphia Museum of Art; bronze castings of them perch on each corner of the museum's roof, protecting its collection. Similarly, prior to the mid-1990s a griffin formed part of the logo of Midland Bank (now HSBC).

The griffin is used in the logo of United Paper Mills, Vauxhall Motors, and of Scania and its former partners Saab Group and Saab Automobile. The latest fighter produced by the Saab Group bears the name "Gripen" (Griffin), as a result of public competition. During World War II, the Heinkel firm named its heavy bomber design for the Luftwaffe after the legendary animal, as the Heinkel He 177 Greif, the German form of "griffin". General Atomics has used the term "Griffin Eye" for its intelligence surveillance platform based on a Hawker Beechcraft King Air 35ER civilian aircraft

The "Griff" statue by Veres Kalman 2007 in the forecourt of the Farkashegyi cemetery in Budapest, Hungary.

Griffins, like many other fictional creatures, frequently appear within works under the fantasy genre. Examples of fantasy-oriented franchises that feature griffins include Warhammer Fantasy Battle, Warcraft, Heroes of Might and Magic, the Griffon in Dungeons & Dragons, Ragnarok Online, Harry Potter, The Spiderwick Chronicles, My Little Pony: Friendship is Magic, and The Battle for Wesnoth.

School emblems and mascots

Three gryphons form the crest of Trinity College, Oxford (founded 1555), originating from the family crest of founder Sir Thomas Pope. The college's debating society is known as the Gryphon, and the notes of its master emeritus show it to be one of the oldest debating institutions in the country, significantly older than the more famous Oxford Union Society. Griffins are also mascots for VU University Amsterdam, Reed College, Sarah Lawrence College, the University of Guelph, and Canisius College.

The official seal of Purdue University was adopted during the university's centennial in 1969. The seal, approved by the Board of Trustees, was designed by Prof. Al Gowan, formerly at Purdue. It replaced an unofficial one that had been in use for 73 years.

The College of William and Mary in Virginia changed its mascot to the griffin in April 2010. The griffin was chosen because it is the combination of the British lion and the American eagle.

The 367th Training Support Squadron's and 12th Combat Aviation Brigade feature griffins in their unit patches.

The emblem of the Greek 15th Infantry Division features an ax-wielding griffin on its unit patch.

The English private school of Wycliffe College features a griffin on its school crest.

The mascot of St Mary's College, one of the 16 colleges in Durham University, is a griffin.

The mascot of Glebe Collegiate Institute in Ottawa is the gryphon, and the team name is the Glebe Gryphons.

The griffin is the official mascot of Chestnut Hill College and Gwynedd Mercy University, both in Pennsylvania.

The mascot of Leadership High School in San Francisco, CA was chosen by the student body by popular vote to be the griffin after the Golden Gate University Griffins, where they operated out of from 1997 to 2000.

The Gryphon is the school mascot for Glenlyon Norfolk School, an independent, co-ed, university preparatory day school in Victoria and Oak Bay, British Columbia, Canada.

Public organizations (non-educational)
A griffin appears in the official seal of the Municipality of Heraklion, Greece.

A griffin appears in the official seal of the Waterloo Police Department (Iowa).

In professional sports
The Grand Rapids Griffins professional ice hockey team of the American Hockey League.

Suwon Samsung Bluewings's mascot "Aguileon" is a griffin. The name "Aguileon" is a compound using two Spanish words; "aguila" meaning "eagle" and "leon" meaning "lion".

Amusement parks
Busch Gardens Williamsburg's highlight attraction is a dive coaster called the "Griffon", which opened in 2007.

In 2013, Cedar Point Amusement Park in Sandusky, Ohio opened the "GateKeeper" steel roller coaster, which features a griffin as its mascot.

In film and television

Film and television company Merv Griffin Entertainment uses a griffin for its production company. Merv Griffin Entertainment was founded by entrepreneur Merv Griffin and is based in Beverly Hills, California. His former company Merv Griffin Enterprises also used a griffin for its logo.

Griffins appear in The Chronicles of Narnia: The Lion, the Witch and the Wardrobe and The Chronicles of Narnia: Prince Caspian.

Griffins are also present in various animated series such as My Little Pony: Friendship is Magic, World of Quest, Yin Yang Yo!, and Family Guy.

A griffin appeared in the 1974 film The Golden Voyage of Sinbad.

In the 1969 movie Latitude Zero, a creature called "Griffin" is made by inserting a woman's brain into a lion–condor hybrid.

In the sitcom The Big Bang Theory, Dr. Sheldon Cooper mentions that he attempted to create a griffon but could not obtain the “necessary eagle eggs and lion semen.”

In business
Saab Automobile previously used the griffin in their logo.

Information security firm Halock uses a griffin to represent protecting data and systems.

Use for real animals
Some large species of Old World vultures are called griffines, including the griffon vulture (Gyps fulvus). The scientific name for the Andean condor is Vultur gryphus, Latin for "griffin-vulture". The Catholic Douay-Rheims version of the Bible uses griffon for a creature referred to as vulture or ossifrage in other English translations (Leviticus 11:13).

Possible influence by dinosaurs

Adrienne Mayor, a classical folklorist and historian of science, has speculated that the way the Greeks imagined griffins from the seventh century BC onwards may have been influenced in part by the fossilized remains of beaked dinosaurs such as Protoceratops observed on the way to gold deposits by nomadic prospectors of ancient Scythia (Central Asia), This speculation is based on Greek and Latin literary sources and related artworks in a specific time frame, beginning with the first written descriptions of griffins as real animals of Asia in a lost work by Aristeas (a Greek who traveled to the Altai region between Mongolia and NW China in the 7th century BC) referenced by Aeschylus and Herodotus (ca. 450 BC) and ending with Aelian (3rd century AD), the last ancient author to report any "new" details about the griffin.

Mayor argues that Protoceratops fossils, seen by ancient observers, may have been interpreted as evidence of a half-bird-half-mammal creature. She argues that over-repeated retelling and drawing or recopying its bony neck frill (which is rather fragile and may have been frequently broken or entirely weathered away) may become large mammal-type external ears, and its beak may be treated as evidence of a part-bird nature and lead to bird-type wings being added.

Paleontologist Mark P. Witton has contested this hypothesis, arguing that it ignores the existence of depictions of griffins throughout the Near East dating to long before the time when Mayor posits the Greeks became aware of Protoceratops fossils in Scythia. Witton further argues that the anatomies of griffins in Greek art are clearly based on those of living creatures, especially lions and eagles, and that there are no features of griffins in Greek art that can only be explained by the hypothesis that the griffins were based on fossils. He notes that Greek accounts of griffins describe them as living creatures, not ancient skeletons, and that some of the details of these accounts suggest griffins are purely imaginary, not inspired by fossils.

Military
Royal Air Force Police depicts a griffin for their unit badge.
 Royal New Zealand Air Force Police depicts a griffin holding a taiaha for their unit badge.

See also
 Chimera, Greek mythological hybrid monster
 Duck billed platypus, an egg-producing mammal with a beak
 Hybrid creatures in mythology
 List of hybrid creatures in mythology
 Nue, Japanese legendary creature
 Pegasus, winged stallion in Greek mythology
 Pixiu or Pi Yao, Chinese mythical creature
 Sharabha, Hindu mythology: lion-bird hybrid
 Snow Lion, Tibetan mythological celestial animal
 Yali, Hindu mythological lion-elephant-horse hybrid

Notes and references

Further reading
 Wild, F., Gryps-Greif-Gryphon (Griffon). Eine sprach-, kultur- und stoffgeschichtliche Studie (Wien, 1963) (Oesterreichische Akademie der Wissenschaften, Philologisch-historische Klasse, Sitzungberichte, 241).
 Bisi, Anna Maria, Il grifone: Storia di un motivo iconografico nell'antico Oriente mediterraneo (Rome: Università) 1965.
 
 Joe Nigg, The Book of Gryphons: A History of the Most Majestic of All Mythical Creatures (Cambridge, Apple-wood Books, 1982).

External links

 The Gryphon Pages, a repository of griffin lore and information
 The Medieval Bestiary: Griffin
 Four Footed Winged Raptors Gryphons of Greece, Europe and the Near East, source texts in Greek, Hebrew, and Old English, with new English translations.
 

 
Egyptian legendary creatures
European legendary creatures
Greek legendary creatures
Heraldic beasts
Mythological birds of prey
Mythological hybrids
Fairy tale stock characters